Prince Global Sports, LLC is an American sporting goods manufacturing company based in Atlanta, Georgia. Founded in 1970, Prince's range of products includes rackets, footwear, apparel, tennis balls, pickleball paddles, stringing machines, hats and bags.

Prince is the leading global manufacturer of tennis rackets.

History 
The company was founded in 1970 by Robert H. McClure of Princeton, New Jersey (the origin of the company's name) as a manufacturer of tennis-ball machines, and soon after, rackets. Howard Head, founder of the Head sporting goods company, took tennis lessons following his retirement and used a Prince tennis ball machine, but was frustrated by his slow improvement. Head joined the Prince company in the early 1970s and developed the company's signature oversized tennis racket. Although the Prince Classic aluminum racket was the first oversized racquet to be patented, the Bentley Fortissimo preceded the patent by two years, causing Germany to invalidate the patent.

During those years, the company was owned by a variety of different firms, including the Benetton Group of Italy, Lincolnshire Management, Inc. (which acquired Prince from Benetton in 2003) and Nautic Partners LLC.

In July 2012, Authentic Brands Group acquired the Prince brand name from Nautic Partners in a procedure that included a voluntary petition for Chapter 11 reorganization in U.S. Bankruptcy Court. Prince Sports' portfolio of brands included Prince (tennis, squash and badminton), Ektelon (racquetball) and Viking (platform/paddle tennis). Its tennis unit recorded $59 million in sales in 2011. Authentic Brands owned the intellectual property rights for the estates of Marilyn Monroe and Bob Marley, among other celebrities.

By September 2012, the Waitt Company agreed to a 40-year license to operate the Prince brand. Prince Global Sports now operates as a subsidiary of Athletic Brands Holding Company, which is majority-owned by the Waitt Company. The company's portfolio of brands also includes Ektelon, Viking and Battle.

After recovering from bankruptcy, in March 2014 Prince announced that it would move its headquarters from Bordentown, New Jersey to Atlanta. Prince's CEO Mike Ballardie stated that Atlanta had a thriving tennis community with more people playing tennis than any other American city, which made it a great base for the company. Atlanta also boasted the largest city tennis league in the world, with more than 80,000 members of the Atlanta Lawn Tennis Association.

Sponsorships

Tennis

Men

  John Isner

  Marcel Granollers

Women

  Mona Barthel
  Vera Zvonareva

Retired players

  Guillermo Coria
  David Nalbandian
  Gabriela Sabatini
  Pat Cash
  Pat Rafter
  Peng Shuai
  Jana Novotná
  Albert Costa
  David Ferrer
  Juan Carlos Ferrero
  María José Martínez Sánchez
  Marion Bartoli
  Oliver Golding
  Annika Beck
  Alex Bogomolov Jr.
  Nikolay Davydenko
  Maria Sharapova
  Jelena Janković
  Daniela Hantuchová
  Johan Brunström
  Kent Carlsson
  Andre Agassi
  Bob Bryan
  Mike Bryan
  Jennifer Capriati
  Michael Chang
  Kathy Rinaldi
  Pam Shriver

Squash 

  Ramy Ashour
  Camille Serme
  Emily Whitlock
  Rebecca Chiu
  Delia Arnold
  Peter Nicol
  John White
  David Evans
  Cassie Jackman
  Julien Bonetat

References

External links

Sportswear brands
Sporting goods manufacturers of the United States
Tennis equipment manufacturers
Clothing companies established in 1970
Manufacturing companies based in Atlanta
1970 establishments in New Jersey
Authentic Brands Group